Dolgoye is a rural locality (a selo) and the administrative center of Dolzhanskoye Rural Settlement, Veydelevsky District, Belgorod Oblast, Russia. The population was 910 as of 2010. There are 11 streets.

Geography 
Dolgoye is located 22 km northeast of Veydelevka (the district's administrative centre) by road. Rossosh is the nearest rural locality.

References 

Rural localities in Veydelevsky District